The 2015 season is the Portland Thorns FC's third season of existence in the National Women's Soccer League, the top division of women's soccer in the United States.

After a disappointing end to the 2014 season that saw the team knocked out of the 2014 NWSL Championship Playoffs by eventual league champions FC Kansas City, head coach Paul Riley sought to make changes that would bolster the team's roster to account for the players who would be called up to their respective national teams during the 2015 FIFA Women's World Cup.  After stellar performances in 2014, goalkeeper Nadine Angerer and midfielder Verónica Boquete were both named to the ten player shortlist of the 2014 FIFA World Player of the Year and Boquete was named to the NWSL Best XI as well as being named 2014 Supporters' Player of the Year.

The team made a number of signings before the 2015 season including Genoveva Añonma who captains the Equatorial Guinea women's national football team, a 2015 NWSL College Draft day trade of the Thorns' 2014 season leading scorer Jessica McDonald for Jodie Taylor of the England women's national football team and leading scorer of the Washington Spirit, and defender Kat Williamson, former Thorns player who had been traded away during the 2014 season.

Several players were loaned out in the offseason including defender Rachel Van Hollebeke to Iga Football Club Kunoichi of the Japanese Nadeshiko League, and goalkeeper Nadine Angerer and defender Stephanie Catley to the Melbourne Victory of the W-League.

Midfielder Verónica Boquete chose to sign with 1. FFC Frankfurt rather than remain with the Thorns for the 2015 season, and three players retired in the offseason, including defender Nikki Marshall, midfielder Sarah Huffman, and midfielder Angie Kerr.

On April 6, 2015, the Thorns unveiled their 2015 kits that were the first custom designs by Nike in the league.

Due to the national team player callups for the 2015 FIFA Women's World Cup, the league announced that they would be taking a two-week break and shortening the season from 24 to 20 games.

The Thorns finished the 2015 season with 23 points from 20 games and did not reach the playoffs, the first (and as of 2020, the only) season in which they did not reach the playoffs.

Club

Coaching staff

Roster
* – denotes amateur call-ups

Source: Portland Thorns (archived)

Match results

Key

Pre-season

Regular season

Standings

Results summary

Results by round

Squad statistics
Source: NWSL

Key to positions: FW – Forward, MF – Midfielder, DF – Defender, GK – Goalkeeper

Player Transactions

National Team Player Allocation 
On January 14, 2015, the league held its NWSL Player Allocation with Portland receiving six players: returning United States women's national soccer team players Alex Morgan, Rachel Van Hollebeke, and Tobin Heath, returning Canada women's national soccer team player Christine Sinclair, and new Canadian internationals Kaylyn Kyle, and Rhian Wilkinson.

National Women's Soccer League College Draft 
The Thorns did not have a pick in the 2015 NWSL College Draft, but through a series of draft day trades they acquired forward and England women's national football team player Jodie Taylor from the Washington Spirit.

Transfers In

Transfers Out

National team participation 
Several Thorns players have been selected to play for their national teams in the 2015 FIFA Women's World Cup in Vancouver, British Columbia, Canada.

See also
 2015 National Women's Soccer League season

References

External links

 

Portland Thorns FC
Portland Thorns FC seasons
Portland Thorns FC
Portland Thorns FC
Portland